The canton of Tallard is an administrative division in southeastern France. At the French canton reorganisation which came into effect in March 2015, the canton was expanded from 9 to 19 communes:
 
Avançon
Barcillonnette
La Bâtie-Vieille
Châteauvieux
Esparron
Fouillouse
La Freissinouse
Jarjayes
Lardier-et-Valença
Lettret
Neffes
Pelleautier
Rambaud
Saint-Étienne-le-Laus
La Saulce
Sigoyer
Tallard 
Valserres
Vitrolles

Demographics

See also
Cantons of the Hautes-Alpes department 
Communes of France

References

Cantons of Hautes-Alpes